The 1933 Oglethorpe Stormy Petrels football team was an American football team that represented Oglethorpe University as an independent during the 1933 college football season. In their tenth year under head coach Harry J. Robertson, the Stormy Petrels compiled a 4–5 record.

Schedule

References

Oglethorpe
Oglethorpe Stormy Petrels football seasons
Oglethorpe Stormy Petrels football